Hardy Pond is a  pond located in Waltham, Massachusetts. Originally almost twice the size, in recent times the pond level was lowered in an inappropriate approach to controlling flooding. The quality of the water has degraded due to eutrophication caused by run-off from roads, fertilizers, and storm drain inputs. It is a popular site for bird sightings, with over 140 species listed.

External links
 Hardy Pond Association was largely responsible for restoring the pond to a healthier state, raising funds for dredging and improvements to the storm sewer system.

Lakes of Middlesex County, Massachusetts
Ponds of Massachusetts